Beth El Synagogue was a synagogue located in Shanghai, China.

Jews began to settle in Shanghai in 1848. At that time, most were Sephardic Jews from Baghdad and Bombay. During the 1870s, the Baghdadi Jewish community used rented space for religious worship. Beth El Synagogue was established in 1887. It was located on Peking Road, a major thoroughfares in the English settlement.

Jacob Elias and Edward Elias Sassoon built the Ohel Rachel Synagogue to replace Beth El Synagogue. Ohel Rachel Synagogue opened in March 1920.

References

Synagogues in Shanghai
Destroyed synagogues
Synagogues completed in 1887
Religious organizations established in 1887
1887 establishments in China
Sephardi synagogues
Orthodox synagogues
Indian-Jewish diaspora
Iraqi-Jewish diaspora in Asia